Empire of the Petal Throne is a fantasy role-playing game designed by M. A. R. Barker, based on his Tékumel fictional universe. It was self-published in 1974, then published by TSR, Inc. in 1975. It was one of the first tabletop role-playing games, along with Dungeons & Dragons, and was the first published RPG game setting. Over the subsequent thirty years, several new games were published based on the Tékumel setting, but to date none have met with commercial success. While published as fantasy, the game is sometimes classified as science fantasy or, debatably, as science fiction.

History

Origin 

University of Minnesota professor M. A. R. Barker, a scholar of ancient languages, had spent decades crafting a fantasy world called Tékumel, writing thousands of pages of histories, describing its culture, and even constructing its languages. He served as adviser to the university's wargaming club, where a club-mate and role-playing game player Michael Mornard showed him Dungeons & Dragons. Barker first self-published 50 copies of his own role-playing game, Empire of the Petal Throne in 1974, the same year that Dungeons & Dragons was published. This version is now referred to as "Manuscript edition". "Empire of the Petal Throne" is a synonym for the Tsolyáni Empire in game.

Barker also wrote another game based in Tékumel: a combat-oriented board game, War of Wizards, in 1975.

1975 TSR edition 
Empire of the Petal Throne influenced Dave Arneson and Gary Gygax, who were impressed with the game. Barker made his commercial game-design debut at TSR, Inc., the publishers of Dungeons & Dragons, with Empire of the Petal Throne boxed set in 1975. TSR published Barker's game and setting as a standalone game, rather than as a "supplement" to the original D&D rules. 

The game brought a level of detail and quality to the concept of a campaign setting which had previously been unknown in the nascent RPG industry's publications. 

The game was the subject of articles in early issues of Dragon magazine, but factors such as inconsistent support from TSR led to its decline in popularity. TSR was locked into a deal that made the financial end of the game unpalatable to them. They had agreed to pay a "finder's fee" on sales in addition to royalties as well as to certain expensive overrides. As a result, the product was more expensive and thus less profitable.

Nightmare Maze of Jigrésh
In 1981, Judges Guild acquired the license to publish an EPT adventure, The Nightmare Maze of Jigrésh, a 16-page booklet written by Michael E. Mayeau, with illustrations by Ken Simpson. In Issue 42 of The Space Gamer, William A. Barton gave a favorable review, saying, "if you have character of at least level 5 in your EPT campaign, and the players aren't the sort who lose interest quickly, The Nightmare Maze of Jigresh may prove to be an interesting change of pace for your Tekumelian excursions."

Later editions
Empire of the Petal Throne was reprinted later as a single book by Different Worlds Publications in 1987.

In 2005, the Canadian publisher Guardians of Order produced Tékumel: Empire of the Petal Throne. The game uses a variation of the Tri-Stat dX system.

Genre
Empire of the Petal Throne'''s setting, Tékumel, used a mixture of fantasy, science fantasy and science fiction backgrounds.

Game designEmpire of the Petal Throne introduced the concept of critical hits with a 20-sided die. Using these rules a player who rolls a 20 on a 20-sided die does double the normal damage, and a 20 followed by a 19 or 20 counts as a killing blow. According to M. A. R. Barker, "this simulates the 'lucky hit' on a vital organ".

Reception
Rick Mataka reviewed Empire of the Petal Throne in The Space Gamer No. 4 (1976). Mataka commented that "So, if you have enjoyed Dungeons and Dragons in the past, then this is the game of the future. Empire of the Petal Throne is the 'now' game for all fantasy gamers."

In the 1980 book The Complete Book of Wargames, game designer Jon Freeman found that :"This game is incredibly detailed, well thought out, and self-consistent. Although it uses the same basic framework as Dungeons & Dragons, the framework is better presented and put together." Noting that the game was a creation of M.A.R. Barker, Freeman believed "That is both a strength and a weakness: an adventurer can experience something more novel and bizarre than is usually the case in the somewhat predictable fantasy version of the Middle Ages, but there is probably no one other than Barker who can adequately run a campaign." Freeman concluded by giving the game an Overall Evaluation of "Fair game but overpriced."

ReviewsComputer and Video Games'' #78

References

Fantasy role-playing games
Role-playing games introduced in 1974
Science fantasy role-playing games
Tékumel
TSR, Inc. games